Stoke Tunnel Cutting, Ipswich is a  geological Site of Special Scientific Interest in Ipswich in Suffolk. It is a Geological Conservation Review site.

This fossiliferous site dates to the late Marine Isotope Stage 7, around 190,000 years ago. It is part of a high level terrace of the River Orwell and it has European pond tortoises, lions, mammoths, woolly rhinoceroses, horses and voles.

There is no public access to the site.

References

Sites of Special Scientific Interest in Suffolk
Geological Conservation Review sites